The Miljacka is a river in Bosnia and Herzegovina that passes through Sarajevo. Numerous city bridges have been built to cross it.

Characteristics

The Miljacka river originates from the confluence of the Paljanska Miljacka and Mokranjska Miljacka rivers. By the time this tributary flows into the Bosna river in Sarajevo, it has an average discharge of 5.7 m³/s. The Miljacka river flows from east to west in a general direction through the city.

The Bosna is a right tributary of the Sava River, with its mouth in Bosanski Šamac. That river in turn flows into the Danube River, which goes southeast and enters the Black Sea chiefly in Romania.

Paljanska Miljacka

Mokranjska Miljacka
The Mokranjska Miljacka,  in length, springs from a large cave, yet to be fully explored, near the village of Kadino Selo at an elevation of  near the base of Romanija mountain.

Mokranjska Miljacka cave

The Miljacka runs out of the cave practically as an underground flow, a subterranean river, where its temperature is measured as low as 5 degrees and temperature of air as low as 8 degrees Celsius.

The exact location of the cave is not yet mapped for the public, but local authorities have released a map which can be used to find its location, as well as a gallery of discoveries within the cave.

A new species of spiders, named Nemanela Lade ("Lada's Little Monster" for its discoverer, Dr. Lada Lukić-Bilela from the Institute for Genetic Technology, Sarajevo), has been found here. Also found are at least five more species of spider, as well as certain species of bats. A skeleton head of a cave bear has also been found at the location. 

Paleontological finds, traces of human habitation, stalactites and stalagmites, as well as pisolite rocks, the river Miljacka wellspring, all makes this cave among most valuable speleological objects in Bosnia and Herzegovina. Researchers believe to have discovered bubbles of air, a possible sign of tectonic activity.

Environment
Because of its poor discharge, the Miljacka is known for its peculiar smell and brown waters. Miljacka river cascades, which regulate the waterbed and enrich the water with oxygen, trap plastic scraps, stranded balls, car tires, and various other waste. The main collector that drains fecal matter is parallel to the flow of the river up to its mouth at the river Bosna. The sewer system is not connected to the main collector, causing leakage of fecal matter directly into the waters of the Miljacka in several places. During the Bosnian War, water treatment was stopped and plant equipment was looted, preventing the local government from dealing with the issue. Estimates of the cost to repair the wastewater plant range from 50 to 60 million euros.

In April 2015, a project called Čista rijeka Miljacka (Clean river Miljacka) was presented. The aim of the project was to bring the river status to category A, which would make the water clean enough for swimming.

In August 2015, the city of Sarajevo signed a contract with ER Project d.o.o. company to clean up 48 river cascades from Šeher-Ćehaja bridge to Dolac Malta suburb bridge.

Floods of 2014

The river swelled almost to the level of city bridges during the 2014 Southeast Europe floods, which brought significant flooding to Bosnia and Herzegovina.

Floods of 2021

The Miljacka was close to submerging some bridges in Sarajevo during the 2021 Bosnia and Herzegovina floods.

Bridges
There are over a dozen bridges over the river Miljacka. Some of the better known ones are:

 Goat's Bridge
 Šeher-Ćehaja Bridge
 Careva ćuprija
 Latin Bridge (also known as "Principov most", namesake of Archduke Franz Ferdinand's assassin Gavrilo Princip). The assassination carried out by Princip, which led to World War I, took place at the entrance on this bridge. Gavrilo's co-conspirator Nedeljko Čabrinović, another member of the Bosnia-Herzegovinian Mlada Bosna movement, jumped into the river Miljacka from the bridge, seconds after throwing a grenade toward the archduke's car. He intended to hide below the bridge so that he could take and swallow a cyanide powder wrapped into a piece of paper.
 Ćumurija Bridge
 Drvenija Bridge
 Čobanija Bridge
 Festina lente bridge
 Skenderija Bridge (a.k.a. "Ajfelov most")
 Suada and Olga bridge (a.k.a. "Vrbanja most")
 Bosmal Bridge (Malaysian-Bosnian Friendship Bridge), a.k.a. "Malezijski most" and "Bosmalov most".
 and several unnamed modern bridges.

Diving
Bentbaša Cliff Diving is a sport organized at location Bentbaša dam every summer at the eastern entrance into the city of Sarajevo (in close proximity to Vijećnica, a library and former City Hall). The diving location water depth is at 3.5 to 4.4 meters depending time of month. Support to this sport in Sarajevo was given by Red Bull Cliff Diving World Series champion Rhiannan Iffland and competitor Jonathan Paredes who attended the 2019 edition.

Past champions of the event:

 2019 -  Dragan Milnović (head jump) /  Aleš Karničnik (high jump)
 2018 -  Igor Arsenić from Banja Luka
 2017 - N/A
 2016 - N/A
 2015 -  Dino Bajrić from Sarajevo

Image gallery

Popular culture
A number of popular local songs were sung about Miljacka river, including "Halid Bešlić - Miljacka" and "Himzo Polovina - Kad ja pođoh na Bembašu".

References

External links

 
Geography of Sarajevo
Rivers of Bosnia and Herzegovina
Miljacka
Subterranean rivers of Bosnia and Herzegovina
Subterranean rivers of Sarajevo